John Burville Biggs  (born 25 October 1934, in Hobart, Tasmania) is an Australian educational psychologist and novelist who developed the SOLO taxonomy for assessing the quality of learning outcomes, and the model of constructive alignment for designing teaching and assessment.

Education
After studying psychology at the University of Tasmania (BA, 1957), he moved to the UK for doctoral studies at the University of London where he was awarded a PhD in 1962.

Career and research
Biggs has held university faculty positions in Australia, Canada, United Kingdom, and Hong Kong. His final institutional affiliation is as Honorary Professor of Psychology at the University of Hong Kong. His most influential work is his concept of constructive alignment, which is an outcomes-based framework for university teaching as described in Teaching for Quality Learning at University published in its fourth edition with Catherine Tang as co-author in 2011. Changing Universities is an academic memoir covering nearly 60 years of involvement with universities in several countries, and in that time universities themselves have changed drastically.

Awards and honours
Biggs was made a Member of the Order of Australia (AM) in the 2017 Queen's Birthday Honours. On 23 February 2022 he was awarded the Universities Australia Australian Awards for University Teaching Career Achievement Award.

Personal life
Since retiring from academic life, Biggs has published short stories and four novels, The Girl in the Golden House, Project Integrens, Disguises and Tin Dragons. Tasmania Over Five Generations  is a social-political history of Tasmania as seen through the eyes of five generations of his own family. Towards Forgiveness: Sino-Tasmanian stories from two islands is a collection of short stories. His 2013 novel was From Ashes to Ashes.

References

1934 births
21st-century Australian novelists
Australian male novelists
Australian non-fiction writers
Australian psychologists
Australian male short story writers
Living people
Educational psychologists
Alumni of the University of London
21st-century Australian short story writers
21st-century Australian male writers
Members of the Order of Australia
Male non-fiction writers
University of Tasmania alumni